Dimensión Costeña is a Nicaraguan musical group that came together in the Caribbean coast of the country in Bluefields.

History
The group has been together for 32 years and in that time they have produced 17 LPs and 13 CDs, most notably an album that can only be bought directly from Nicaragua known as "Merry Christmas Nicaragua." This Christmas album is known for having all of the classic Christmas songs combined with the band's authentic sound and incorrect lyrics. The album first made it to the UK, the first country (Other than Nicaragua) to have the album, in 2005 when Clayton Payne, a man well known in the Fenland area for his football expertise and travelling abroad, brought it back when he saw a local selling the album in Managua Airport.

The band have performed in many places through the world: from Managua to Los Angeles, from Miami to Europe.

Band members
Dimension Costena consists of eight members, all of whom are from the coast area.

The main band member is called Luis Cassells, who dubs himself as the "Director Artistico" or the Artistic Director. Anthony Mathews and Anthony De Costena on vocals.

See also
Music of Nicaragua
Culture of Nicaragua

References

External links
 Dimension Costena on Myspace

Nicaraguan musical groups